The 2009–10 CERH European League was the 45th edition of the CERH European League organized by CERH. Its Final Six was held in May 2010 at PalaLido in Valdagno, Italy.

Group stage
In each group, teams played against each other home-and-away in a home-and-away round-robin format.

The group winners advanced directly to the Final Six while the runners-up advanced to a qualifying play-off.

Group A

Group B

Group C

Group D

Qualifying play-off
The two winners of this play-off would join the Final Six competition with the four group winners.

|}

Final Six
The 2010 European League Final Six was held in May 2010 in Valdagno, Italy.

Group stage

Group E

Group F

Final

External links
 
 CERH website
 Final 6--Official Website 
 Italian web site with Live Scores

International
  Roller Hockey links worldwide
  Mundook-World Roller Hockey
 Hardballhock-World Roller Hockey
 Inforoller World Roller Hockey 
  World Roller Hockey Blog
 rink-hockey-news - World Roller Hockey

International roller hockey competitions hosted by Italy
2009 in roller hockey
2010 in roller hockey
2010 in Italian sport
Rink Hockey Euroleague